Radiacmea inconspicua is a species of small sea snail or true limpet, a marine  gastropod mollusc in the family Lottiidae, one of the true limpet families.

References

 Powell A. W. B., William Collins Publishers Ltd, Auckland 1979 
 Bruce A. Marshall, Molluscan and brachiopod taxa introduced by F. W. Hutton in The New Zealand journal of science; Journal of the Royal Society of New Zealand, Volume 25, Issue 4, 1995

Lottiidae
Gastropods described in 1843
Taxa named by John Edward Gray